Northwestern Mutual is an American financial services mutual organization based in Milwaukee, Wisconsin. The financial security company provides consultation on wealth and asset income protection, education planning, retirement planning, investment advisory services, financial planning trust and private client services, estate planning and business planning. Its products include life insurance, permanent life insurance, disability income, and long-term care insurance; annuities; investments; and investment advisory products and services. Northwestern Mutual ranked No. 90 on the 2021 Fortune 500 list of the largest United States corporations by total revenue and is in the top 30 by assets held. The firm distributes a portion of its earnings to eligible policyholders as annual dividends.

History
Northwestern Mutual was founded as the Mutual Life Insurance Company of the State of Wisconsin on March 2, 1857.  Originally located in Janesville, Wisconsin, the fledgling company relocated to Milwaukee in 1859.  Shortly after, the company experienced its first two death claims, when an excursion train traveling from Fond du Lac, Wisconsin, to Chicago derailed, killing 14 people, two of whom were policy owners. With losses amounting to $3,500 while the company possessed only $2,000 in funds, company President Samuel Daggett and Treasurer Charles Nash personally lent the money to pay the claims immediately.

In 1864, the company paid its first dividends to policy owners. It again paid dividends in 1867 and 1870, and has done so annually since 1872. By 1865, the company was operating throughout the Midwest and had entered the market along the East Coast, and the board of trustees changed the company's name to The Northwestern Mutual Life Insurance Company.

Throughout the early years of the 20th century, Northwestern Mutual Life Insurance Company focused on life insurance. At the same time, the company worked to increase its accountability. In 1907, company leaders invited policy owners who were not trustees to probe into finances for accountability. This practice has continued to the present day; members of the Policy owners’ Examining Committee have unrestricted access to evaluate Northwestern Mutual's operations, management and strategic plans independently.

In the mid-20th century, Northwestern Mutual Life Insurance Company invested in the iron and minerals industries on a large-scale basis, including the construction of a freighter, the first such investment by any American life insurance company. In 1958, the company launched the iron ore carrier SS Edmund Fitzgerald, named for longtime executive and newly elected company chairman Edmund Fitzgerald. At 729 feet and 13,632 gross tons, the vessel was the largest ship on the Great Lakes for thirteen years, until 1971. The Fitzgerald sank on November 10, 1975, in Lake Superior, killing all 29 men aboard. The disaster was immortalized the next year by songwriter Gordon Lightfoot in "The Wreck of the Edmund Fitzgerald." The sinking led to changes in Great Lakes and national shipping regulations and practices that included mandatory survival suits, depth finders, positioning systems, increased freeboard, and more frequent inspection of vessels.

In 1969, the company began offering disability insurance. Less than a decade later, a series of retirement annuities were introduced for the employee benefits market. In the 1990s, the company saw further growth with the introduction of its long-term care insurance. In 2000, to reflect this broadening of its product offerings, the company changed its name again, shortening it to simply Northwestern Mutual.

In 2001 the company continued to expand its product and service offerings by launching a wholly owned subsidiary known today as Northwestern Mutual Wealth Management Company (NMWMC), a federal savings bank. Through NMWMC, the company offers a range of financial planning products and services including investment management, fee-based financial planning, business retirement plans, and trust and private client services.

In 2015 Northwestern Mutual began construction of Northwestern Mutual Tower and Commons in downtown Milwaukee; the skyscraper opened in 2017. Also in 2015, Northwestern Mutual bought financial planning company LearnVest for over $250 million. In 2018, Northwestern Mutual reduced underwriting time and introduced an online digital platform for clients. The company registered the .northwesternmutual top-level domain, which at 18 characters is currently one of the longest TLDs. From 2015 to 2020, Northwestern Mutual served as the presenting sponsor of the Rose Bowl Game, an NCAA Division I college football bowl game played annually on New Year's Day.

As of 2021, the company has $308.8 billion in assets, $31.1 billion in revenues, and $2 trillion worth of active life insurance protection. Through its wealth management and investment services businesses, the company manages $200 billion of investments owned by its 4.75 million clients.

Subsidiaries 
The company's services and products are offered through several subsidiaries:

 Mason Street Advisors is an SEC-registered investment advisor for Northwestern Mutual Series Fund variable annuity and variable life products.
 Northwestern Long Term Care Insurance Company offers Northwestern Mutual's long-term care insurance.
 Northwestern Mutual Investment Management Company manages Northwestern Mutual's investments in public and private debt, private equity and real estate.
 Northwestern Mutual Investment Services is the company's broker-dealer, which is also a registered investment advisor and member FINRA and SIPC.
 Northwestern Mutual Wealth Management Company provides financial planning, investment advisory and trust services, and is a federal savings bank.

Financial ratings 
Northwestern Mutual has the highest financial strength ratings currently awarded to U.S. life insurers by all of the major rating agencies.

Investment and innovation 
Since launching in 2017, Northwestern Mutual Future Ventures, Northwestern Mutual's venture capital arm, has invested more than $50 million in 18 tech startups.  

In 2019, the company partnered with Accenture, Advocate Aurora Health, Johnson Controls, Kohl's and Rockwell Automation to form the MKE Tech Hub Coalition, an effort focused on attracting and retaining tech talent in the Milwaukee region.

In June 2020, Northwestern Mutual also reported a $1.6 million pledge to All-In Milwaukee to finance the latest Talent of the Future initiative over the next four years, through its Foundation and in collaboration with the Diversity and Inclusion department.

Research 
Northwestern Mutual regularly publishes research examining U.S. adults’ attitudes and behaviors toward money, financial decision-making and caregiving.

Awards and honors
Northwestern Mutual was ranked No. 368 among America's Best Employers 2021 by Forbes.

See also
 List of tallest buildings in Milwaukee

References

Financial services companies established in 1857
Mutual insurance companies of the United States
Life insurance companies of the United States
Companies based in Milwaukee
American companies established in 1857
1857 establishments in Wisconsin